Dunmore High School is the secondary education, public school for the borough of Dunmore, Pennsylvania.  It is part of the Dunmore School District. Dunmore High School is located at 300 West Warren Street. According to the National Center for Education Statistics, in the 2017–2018 school year, Dunmore High School reported an enrollment of 728 pupils in grades 7 through 12.

Dunmore High School is one of the three (Scranton, Old Forge, Dunmore) school districts in Lackawanna County, Pennsylvania that does not include surrounding boroughs. In June 2014, Dunmore School Board closed the junior high school and consolidated the 7th and 8th grades into the high school building. The middle school functions separately from the high school.

Extracurriculars
Dunmore School District offers a wide variety of clubs, activities and an extensive sports program.

Athletics
The varsity football program was coached by Jack Henzes until he officially resigned in the spring of 2019. The Dunmore bucks are now lead by Kevin McHale. In 2007, the Dunmore Bucks traveled to Hersheypark Stadium in Hershey, Pennsylvania to play against Terrelle Pryor and the Jeanette Jayhawks for the PIAA Class AA State Title. However, they lost the game with a score of 49-21. Furthermore, the Dunmore Bucks returned to Hersheypark Stadium in Hershey, Pennsylvania, on December 14, 2012, to play for the PIAA State Title; however, this time the Bucks took on the Clariton Bears. Unfortunately, the Bucks lost with a final score of 20-0. In addition to its football program, Dunmore is also home to a girls basketball program, coached by Ben O'Brien. In 2011, the Lady Bucks traveled to the Bryce Jordan Center in University Park, Pennsylvania to play for the PIAA Class AA Girls Basketball Championship. The girls battled against Villa Maria Academy, but they were unsuccessful, losing the game with a score of 62-39.

Student-athletes from Dunmore High School have accepted scholarships to many nationally ranked colleges and universities, including Bucknell University, Bryant University, University of Hartford, University of Delaware, University of Connecticut and Temple University.

Overall, Dunmore High School offers numerous varsity sports including:

Baseball
Softball
Boys Basketball
Girls Basketball
Football 
Boys Cross Country 
Girls Cross Country
Golf
Boys Soccer
Girls Soccer
Boys Tennis
Girls Tennis
Boys Track and Field
Girls Track
Girls Swim Team
Girls Volleyball
Football Cheerleading
Basketball Cheerleading
Dance Team
Silk Squad

According to PIAA directory July 2015

Activities
Dunmore High School's student body is very active within the school and in the local community. In 2011, the Crimson Courier, Dunmore High School's newspaper, was nationally recognized for its work on an ongoing piece,  entitled "Made In America". The newspaper staff was briefly shown on World News With Diane Sawyer in a segment featuring the push to buy American-made products. A more complete article with the students' work was published on ABC News' website.

Overall, Dunmore High School has numerous organizations for its students to become involved with including:

 Marching Band
 Chorus
 Show Choir
 Spanish Club
 French Club
 Health Careers Club
 Newspaper
 Honor Society
 Students Against Destructive Decisions (SADD) Club
 Student Government
 Service Club
 Yearbook Staff
 Computer Club
 Mock Trial Team
 Art Club
 Drama Club (Crimson Company)

Alma mater
The following are the lyrics to Dunmore High School's Alma Mater:

Dear Dunmore, thy honor is safe in the hands
Of thy sons and thy daughters so true.
Thy students and athletes fresh victories each year
Shall win for the Crimson and Blue.

We will strive with our might
Thy fond name to exalt.
We will sacrifice self to thee aim,
And united in heart and in hand will achieve,
Only deeds that shall add to thy fame.

Notable alumni
Carol Ann Drazba
Vic Fangio
Mike Fanucci
Jeanne Marrazzo
Joseph Minish
Jim O'Hora
Lou Palazzi
Paul W. Richards
John Francis Ropek
Tim Ruddy
Kenneth J. Smith
Junior Walsh
Jim Halpert (fictional)

References

External links

Public high schools in Pennsylvania
Educational institutions established in 1932
Schools in Lackawanna County, Pennsylvania
1932 establishments in Pennsylvania